Pedro Murúa Leguizamon  (25 December 1930 – 3 November 2019) was a Spanish field hockey player who competed in the 1960 Summer Olympics. He was born in San Sebastián and died in the same city, and was the grandson of Basque industrialist and politician Luis Lezama Leguizamón.

References

External links
 

1930 births
2019 deaths
Spanish male field hockey players
Olympic field hockey players of Spain
Field hockey players at the 1960 Summer Olympics
Olympic bronze medalists for Spain
Olympic medalists in field hockey
Sportspeople from San Sebastián
Medalists at the 1960 Summer Olympics
Field hockey players from the Basque Country (autonomous community)
20th-century Spanish people